The Totenkirchl is mountain, 2,190 m high, in the Wilder Kaiser range in the Northern Limestone Alps in Austria, east of Kufstein in Tyrol.

The mountain is one of the most famous climbs in the Northern Limestone Alps with over 50 climbing routes of UIAA grade III. It is particularly known for its chimneys including the  Dülfer Chimney (Dülfer-Kamin) named after Hans Dülfer. The base camp for tours on the Totenkirchl is the Stripsenjochhaus owned by the ÖAV.

External links 
Climbs on the Totenkirchl 

Mountains of the Alps
Mountains of Tyrol (state)
Kaiser Mountains
Two-thousanders of Austria